Armand Burtin (3 November 1896 – 13 August 1972) was a French middle-distance runner.

In 1920 Burtin won the national title in the 1500 m event, but failed to reach the final at the 1920 Summer Olympics. He did better in the 3000 m, finishing fourth and eleventh individually at the 1920 and 1924 Summer Olympics, and fourth with the French team at both Games.

References

External links
 

1896 births
1972 deaths
French male middle-distance runners
Olympic athletes of France
Athletes (track and field) at the 1920 Summer Olympics
Athletes (track and field) at the 1924 Summer Olympics